Dawuroampong is a town in the Central region of Ghana. The town is known for the Gomoa Secondary and Technical School. The school is a second cycle institution.

References

Populated places in the Central Region (Ghana)